A Manhã do Mundo (literally The Morning of the World) is a debut novel by the Portuguese writer Pedro Guilherme-Moreira.

The book takes its beginnings on the September 11 attacks.

It was released in Portuguese in May 2011, by Publicações Dom Quixote.

Release 

The book's launch in the author's hometown, took place in Clube Literário do Porto (literally "Oporto Literary Club"), July 10, with a presentation by Professor Pinto da Costa.

Plot summary 
"09/11 2001. And if anyone who has seen everything could, suddenly, wake up in time to prevent the tragedy?". This is a presupposition which, on the cover, this novel presents.

At the core, this is a story of five persons, Thea, Mark Millard, Alice and Solomon, who jumped from the Twin Towers on September 11, 2001. It is also the story of Ayda, who calls them cowards, and of her husband. Now "imagine that on September 13, the Universe resets the day 11 for some of them."

References

External links 
 Book's blog (in Portuguese and English)
 Book's page on Facebook
 Author's channel at YouTube. (in Portuguese and English)
 Interview about the book by the author to Ana Daniela Ferreira on "À Volta dos Livros" in Antena 1, on 22 June 2011 (Portuguese)
 Video presentation of the book in, Diário de Notícias of 28 May 2011 (Portuguese)
 Reference to the book on the television show "Autores" in, TVI24 of June 24, 2011. Minute 42.(Portuguese)
 Interview about the book A Manhã do Mundo by the author to Ana Daniela Ferreira on "À Volta dos Livros", at Antena 1, on 22 June 2011. (in Portuguese)
 Interview about the book A Manhã do Mundo by the author to TV show "Câmara Clara", at RTP2, on 9 September 2011. From 3 min 27 s. (in Portuguese)
 Interview about the book A Manhã do Mundo by the author to Ana Rita Clara, on TV show "Mais Mulher", at SIC Mulher, in September 2011. (in Portuguese)

2011 novels
21st-century Portuguese novels
Novels about the September 11 attacks
Novels set in New York City
2011 debut novels